The Diocese of Duvno was a Latin rite diocese of the Catholic Church that was established in the 14th century with a seat in present-day Tomislavgrad in Bosnia and Herzegovina. From the late 17th century onwards, it was administered by the bishops of Makarska, though by the 19th century it was only a titular see. On 5 July 1881 Pope Leo XIII incorporated it into the newly established Diocese of Mostar-Duvno. Its last titular bishop was Cyryl Lubowidzki, who held the title until 1897, when it was formally suppressed.

The seat of the diocese was in the former fortress of Rog, located in present-day Roško Polje near Tomislavgrad, and the cathedral church was the Church of St. John the Baptist. The church was destroyed by the Ottomans in the late 17th century.

History

Background 

In the 14th century, when the Diocese of Duvno was established, the Archbishop of Split had a right to establish dioceses in his metropolitan area and appoint and consecrate the bishops. The exact year of the establishment of the Diocese of Duvno remains unknown. It is not mentioned before the rule of Paul I Šubić of Bribir, and it was most probably established by the Archbishop of Split Petar, O.F.M., who served as the archbishop from 1297 to 1324. The establishment of the Diocese of Duvno, as well as the dioceses Šibenik and Makarska was initiated for the political goals of the Šubić family, the dukes of Bribir. Namely, in this way, they would secure support among the clergy.

On the verge of the 13th to 14th century, the sons of Paul Šubić – Mladen, George and Paul, after securing the territory of the eastern Adriatic hinterland, adopted the title of a "Duke of Tropolje, Livno and Cetina". They intended to extend their territories further east towards the hinterland and establish the highest church organisation there.

At the time, the circumstances within the Papacy allowed the Šubić's to implement their church policy. The Papacy at the time, faced complex issues, including the dispute with Philip IV of France over the taxation of clergy and expropriation of the church's property and especially the property previously owned by the Knights Templar. This resulted in moving the papal seat to Avignon. The Avignon popes used the church institutions mainly to collect taxes to build their new residence in Avignon. As the Šubić's were able to issue their own currency, they were wealthy and good taxpayers, so they were allowed to pursue their church policies.

The rival to the Šubić family were the Kotromanićs who ruled the Banate of Bosnia. For example, Stephen II Kotromanić, although himself a Latin Catholic, supported the heterodox Bosnian Church, which in return, supported the claims of the Kotromanić family. The Bosnian Church, protected by the Kotromanić family, managed to expand outside of its Bosnian core to Zachlumia, Tropolje and the area between Neretva and Cetina. Thus, the Šubić's were seen as the fighters for the orthodoxy against the heterodox Bosnian Church. Thus, Pope John XXII calls Mladen II Šubić to remove "the enemies of the Christ's Cross" from Bosnia. The Šubić's mission to appropriate the members of the Bosnian Church to the Catholic Church gained them a favour among the Bosnian Franciscan missionaries. They constructed Franciscan friaries and appointed Franciscans as bishops in the dioceses under their control.

Establishment and early years 

Škegro writes that the Diocese of Duvno was established somewhere around the establishment of the Diocese of Makarska, if not at the same time. Franciscan historian Dominik Mandić puts the establishment of the Diocese of Duvno between 1274 and 1297. Other authors, like Karlo Jurišić, Slavko Kovačić and Krunoslav Draganović, also put the establishment of the Diocese of Duvno at the end of the 13th century and beginning of the 14th century respectively.

The cathedral church of the Diocese of Duvno was the Church of St. John the Baptist, located within the fortress of Rog, in present-day Roško Polje. John the Baptist was the Šubićs' patron saint, along with Mary, mother of Jesus, so they consecrated to them the churches and monasteries that they would build.

The collapse of the Šubićs' power in Duvno after the Kotromanićs takeover in 1322, resulted badly for Bishop Madius of Duvno, who complained to Pope Clement VI that he had to leave his seat because of the "evil of the people". Many authors, like Ivo Bagarić, Slavko Kovačić, and Damir Kabrić consider that the "evil of the people" referred to the resistance of the local populace to the Church authorities over the taxation, which would be impossible under the rule of the Šubićs. The fall of Duvno also enabled the spread of the Bosnian Church, and at the same time, a significant Vlach population arrived on the territory of Duvno. The Vlachs were especially averse to the Church authorities, and often, in order to avoid the taxation, they would also change their confession. The proof that the Diocese of Duvno suffered a hard time after Šubićs fall is a testimony of an anonymous Spanish travel writer who in the second quarter of the 14th century wrote that the Catholics are almost non-existent in Bosnia.

Ever since its establishment, the Diocese of Duvno suffered from poverty and the personal insecurity of the bishops. In 1345, Madius' successor John of Leoncello was freed from paying a regular fee paid by the diocesan bishops upon their appointment because of poverty. For those reasons, the bishops of Duvno were forced to live outside their diocese and lived mostly on the territory of the Archdiocese of Split, where, at the same time, they held high posts. On the other hand, they would suffer from serious poverty. For example, Bishop Stephen, who resided in the Diocese of Duvno, was forced to beg due to poor conditions, and later, as a high-ranking church dignitary in Split, he acted as a missionary for his Diocese of Duvno.

One of the canons of the Diocese of Duvno, Nicholas, became a bishop in his own right in present-day Albania in 1472.

Ottoman conquest 

During the Ottoman conquest of Herzegovina in the 1470s, the bishops of Duvno, who only occasionally resided in the fortress of Rog, were forced to leave their cathedral church. The Diocese of Duvno thus practically became a missionary territory. Finally, in 1477, the fortress of Rog, as well as the wider area of Duvno, became an Ottoman nahiyah in the Sanjak of Herzegovina.

During the Ottoman rule, in order to survive, the bishops of Duvno relied on Franciscans and their own families respectively. During their missionary activity, the bishops had no official residence on the territory of the diocese and held the religious services around the ruins of the destructed church objects.

During the reign of bishop Pavao Posilović, in 1655, the Franciscan friary of St. Peter in present-day Prozor-Rama was mentioned as the cathedral church of the Diocese of Duvno. The Friary of St. Peter served to Posilović as a temporary refuge.

Apostolic Vicariate of Bosnia 

The territory that remained in the Ottoman Empire after the Austro-Turkish War (1716–1718) and signing of the Treaty of Passarowitz in 1718, became part of the Apostolic Vicariate of Bosnia, by the decree of Pope Clement XII of 1735. By this decree, the Holy See harmonised the ecclesiastical situation with the political one. It was also in accordance with the Ottoman policy that the clergy serving in its territory should be Ottoman subjects. A special ecclesiastical province under Ottoman Empire was promoted by the Bosnian Franciscans with the help of the Bishop of Zadar Vicko Zmajević. The initiative was accepted by the Propaganda, which asked the Pope to appoint the new bishop for the Catholics in the Ottoman Bosnia, which would be appointed from the ranks of the Bosnian Franciscans. The territory encompassed by the Vicariate of Bosnia included the territory of the dioceses of Duvno and Bosnia, parts of the dioceses of Makarska, and the Archdiocese of Split that fell under the Ottoman rule. The first apostolic vicar was Mato Divelić. The appointment of a special bishop of Duvno was, at the time, impossible, because during the Morean War (1684–1699) the regions of Duvno and Rama were devastated, while the Friary of St. Peter that served as a temporary cathedral was destroyed by the Ottomans in 1687. Further, the Catholics of Duvno largely left the region during the Ottoman–Venetian War (1714–1718) and settled in the neighbouring regions under the Venetian control.

Episcopal ordinaries

See also 
Catholic Church in Bosnia and Herzegovina

Notes

References

Books

Journals

Source and External links 
 GCatholic Mostar-Duvno, with incumbent bio links

Dioceses established in the 6th century
Duvno
Former Roman Catholic dioceses in Bosnia and Herzegovina
Religion in Bosnia and Herzegovina during Ottoman period
Religion in medieval Bosnia and Herzegovina